Fantasmas is a collection of previously released and unreleased songs by Glorium. 200 copies were released on Golden Hour Records in 2004 on compact disc.

Background
In 1996, Glorium recorded material with producer John Croslin in his studio with the hopes of releasing a full-length album. After no interest from any labels, the band self-released a 7-inch single of Black Market Hearts b/w Walkie-Talkie on Golden Hour Records. The rest of the Croslin material was not used until Fantasmas.

In 2005 the band began to discuss releasing a compilation of these and other previously-released vinyl recordings, as well as outtakes from other recording sessions throughout their active career.

Paul Streckfus designed the CD artwork.

Track listing
 "The Double"+ – 3:20 
 "Black Market Hearts"*+ – 4:06 
 "The Door is Ajar"++ – 1:18
 "Vaccine, Mercury Rises"+ – 4:02 
 "Psyklops"+ – 4:33 
 "Brownie Hawkeye"+ – 3:11
 "Walkie-Talkie"+ – 5:52
 "Mother Machine"+++ – 4:57
 "My Wandering Mountain"++++ – 5:36
 "Future News from the Front Line"++++ – 3:39
 "Ghost-Writer"++++ – 4:10
 "Rip-Off"++++ – 2:38
 "Here We Come To Your City"& – 3:43
 Electricidad (
 My Demolition
 Fearless
 Iced The Swelling
 Divebomb

Personnel
George Lara – bass
Juan Miguel Ramos – drums
Ernest Salaz – guitar, vocals
Lino Max – guitar, vocals
Paul Streckfus – vocals
 * Nikki Holiday – synthesizer
 + John Croslin – producer
 ++ Adam Wiltzie – engineer
 +++ Mark Phillips – engineer
 ++++ Kurtis D. Machler – engineer
 & Grant Barger – producer, engineer
 Greg Goodman, mastering engineer

References

Glorium albums
2004 compilation albums